Peres is a Portuguese, Galician, and Sephardic-Jewish surname. Its Spanish variant is Pérez.

In the Hungarian language, it means litigant ("peres fél"). It is common in both forms Peres and Perez as well as Peretz among descendants of Sephardi Jews in Puerto Rico. 

In Hebrew (  ), it is the name of the bird species "Gypaetus barbatus" (lammergeier). However, Peres, Perez, and Peretz are the transliteration of the Hebrew פרץ son of Tamar and Judah. In the biblical Book of Daniel, the words which form the "writing on the wall" at Belshazzar's feast are recorded initially as mene, mene, tekel, upharsin (Daniel 5:25) but the final word is given as peres in verse 28, where its meaning is said to be "Your kingdom has been divided, and given to the Medes and Persians".

People with the surname Peres include:
 Adans Lopez Peres (born 1975), Portuguese second husband of Princess Stéphanie of Monaco
 Asher Peres (1934-2005), Israeli physicist (born Aristide Pressman)
 Bernardo Peres da Silva (1775-1844), the only native governor of Portuguese India
 Cristiana Peres (born 1987), Brazilian actress
 Fernão Peres de Trava (c.1090-1155), Galician medieval nobleman
 Javier Peres (20th-21st century), American art dealer
 Marinho Peres (born 1947), Brazilian footballer
 Paio Peres Correia (born c. 1205), Portuguese medieval nobleman
 Shimon Peres (1923-2016), Israeli politician (born Szymon Perski)
 Sonia Peres (1923-2011), Israeli first lady
 Valdir Peres (1951-2017), Brazilian footballer
 Vimara Peres (died 873), Galician medieval count and first Count of Portucale
 Peres (Portuguese footballer) (born 1939), full name António Francisco de Jesus Moreira, Portuguese football midfielder
 Peres (Brazilian footballer) (born 1974), full name Peres Spíndula de Oliveira, Brazilian football forward

References

See also 
 Pérès, French surname
 Des Peres (disambiguation)
 Pérez (disambiguation)
 Pires (disambiguation)
 Peiris. Sri Lankan version of Peres
 Peres-Horodecki criterion, a necessary condition in Quantum information theory
 Peres-Hussein London Agreement, between King Hussein of Jordan and Israeli Foreign Affairs Minister Shimon Peres
 River des Peres, an urban river in St. Louis, United States
 Peres Jepchirchir (born 1993), Kenyan runner and half marathon world champion

Portuguese-language surnames
Galician-language surnames
Sephardic surnames
Jewish surnames
Surnames from given names